Mark Keane (born 17 March 2000) is an Irish professional Australian rules footballer who plays for the Adelaide Football Club after previously playing for the Collingwood Football Club in the Australian Football League (AFL). Keane grew up in Ireland and played Gaelic football before making a code switch to Australian rules football.

AFL career 
Keane joined Collingwood as a Category B rookie in 2018 after a two-week trial at the club. He made his debut in the club's round 9 match in the 2020 AFL season against , where the Magpies lost by 12 points.

GAA career 
Keane returned to Ireland in 2020 and was brought on as a substitute for Cork against Kerry in the 2020 Munster Senior Football Championship. He scored the late goal that knocked Kerry out of the competition, in what was described as "one of the biggest upsets in recent championship history... a strike so late it had eerie echoes of Tadhg Murphy's 1983 goal at the same end of the ground that similarly put Kerry out of the championship".

Statistics
 Statistics are correct to the end of the 2021 season

|- style="background-color: #eaeaea"
! scope="row" style="text-align:center" | 2019
|  || 47 || 0 || — || — || — || — || — || — || — || — || — || — || — || — || — || —
|- 
! scope="row" style="text-align:center" | 2020
|  || 47 || 1 || 0 || 0 || 5 || 1 || 7 || 1 || 2 || 0.0 || 0.0 || 5.0 || 1.0 || 7.0 || 1.0 || 2.0
|- style="background-color: #eaeaea"
! scope="row" style="text-align:center" | 2021
|  || 11 || 4 || 0 || 1 || 31 || 25 || 56 || 23 || 1 || 0.0 || 0.3 || 7.8 || 6.3 || 14.0 || 5.8 || 0.3
|- class="sortbottom"
! colspan=3| Career
! 5
! 0
! 1
! 36
! 27
! 63
! 24
! 3
! 0.0
! 0.2
! 7.2
! 5.4
! 12.6
! 4.8
! 0.6
|}

Notes

References

External links 

 
 
 

2000 births
Living people
Collingwood Football Club players
Mitchelstown Gaelic footballers
Ballygiblin hurlers
Avondhu hurlers
Avondhu Gaelic footballers
Cork inter-county hurlers
Cork inter-county Gaelic footballers
Gaelic footballers who switched code
Irish emigrants to Australia
Irish players of Australian rules football
Sportspeople from County Cork